The Stourbridge and Kidderminster Bank was a bank that operated in England from 1834 until 1880 when it was taken over by the Birmingham Banking Company.

History
The bank was established in April 1834 by the industrialist James Foster with an office in High Street, Stourbridge. The building had been Foster's residence before his move to Stourton Castle. Originally called "Park House", it became known as "Bank House" after its conversion into offices. The first manager, John Amery and first cashier, Samuel Nock had living quarters in the bank building itself. Amery had been recruited from the Birmingham branch of the Bank of England. On formation, the bank had paid-up capital of £34,000. James Foster remained as chairman until 1850.

In June 1834 a branch was opened at Kidderminster. In the same year it opened a branch in Bromsgrove and took over the business of Oldaker, Tomes and Chattaway in Stratford-on-Avon. The Bromsgrove branch was initially only open for 1 day per week, but in 1851, the company of Rufford Biggs failed, and the Stourbridge and Kidderminster obtained their premises at 93 High Street, Bromsgrove.

It was taken over by the Birmingham Banking Company in 1880.

Branches

Alcester ca. 1839
Brierley Hill 1864
Bromsgrove August 1834
Charlbury 1853 
Chipping Norton ca. 1839
Henley in Arden ca. 1839
Kidderminster 30 June 1834 
Moreton-in-Marsh ca. 1839
Redditch 1835
Shipston-on-Stour 1835
Stourbridge 10 April 1834
Stourport
Stratford-upon-Avon 1834
Worcester 1864

References

Defunct banks of the United Kingdom
Banks of the United Kingdom
Private banks
Banks established in 1834
Banks disestablished in 1880
Stourbridge
Kidderminster
1834 establishments in England